Oh! Phnom Penh is a Cambodian song written by Mum Bunnaray in 1979 as the Khmers Rouges left Phnom Penh and its population returned to a devastated city. It has been recognized as "Cambodia's heritage protected forever".

History

A smot for the fall of Phnom Penh 
Oh! Phnom Penh came out just a few months after the Khmer Rouge regime collapsed and the populations that were starving in the countryside could come back to the city from which they had been chased three years before. The lyrics of Oh! Phnom Penh were written Keo Chenda, who would later be Minister for Culture and Information and governor of Phnom Penh from 1982 to 1985. Keo Chenda also wrote the national anthem of the People's Republic of Kampuchea. The music Oh, Phnom Penh! was composed by Catholic Khmer composer Mum Bunnaray, who was working at the national radio station in Phnom Penh. The latter asked his sister Mum Sokha to sing in the single. The song was recorded on January 3, 1979, in Kratie province and first broadcast on January 7, 1979. It was the first song to be broadcast after the fall of the Khmer Rouge regime. According to Khmer scholar Linda Saphan, "blasted throughout the countryside, the song spread a message of hope and return to normalcy and a desperate reminder that music lived on despite the terror of the genocide."

This sad song marked the beginning of a new life in the field of art, culture and other fields in Cambodia, and is one among a series of songs that have helped to serve the memory of the Cambodian people until now, to heal the wounds left from the Khmer Rouge.

A deep song on an ideological divide after the return of monarchy 
The use of the song, as well as the celebration of the liberation of 7 January, was controversial in the 1990s when the political parties were reunified. In late 1990s, the song return and was heard on public media.

Becoming Cambodia's heritage protected forever 
In 2011, a controversy arose as Cambodian pop singers attempted to make a cover of the song while changing its lyrics. The move was sensitive and seen as offensive for a generation which still suffered greatly from this trauma. It was also revealing of a generation gap between a generation of parents who survived the war and children who have only suffered from its consequences. While this decision was not understood by foreign media seeing a media ban rather than the result of a national trauma, Minister Khieu Kanharith said in his letter condemning the cover of this historical landmark song that:Today, Oh! Phnom Penh has become a colloquial form of lament on the state of the city of Phnom Penh, which stills suffers from the wounds and chaos left from the war, despite significant private and public investments.

Composition 
The title of Oh! Phnom Penh echoes as in a palinode the first words "Oh! Battambang" of the Cambodian rock classic Champa Battambang, and the difference of tone and content between the two songs reflects the dramatic shift from the joie de vivre of the Sangkum to the devastation of Year Zero. The melody of the song is monodic and follows the lines of the Cambodian lament of smot creating an effect of nostalgia and sadness on the heart of Khmer people.

Lyrics

References

Links 

 Music score of Oh! Phnom Penh, Documentation Center of Cambodia.

1970s songs
Cambodian songs